Heartstone (Hjartasteinn) is a 2016 Icelandic drama film directed by Guðmundur Arnar Guðmundsson. It tells the story of a strong friendship between two preteen boys in a small Icelandic fishing village and the emotional and sexual turbulence of adolescence.

It was screened in the Discovery section at the 2016 Toronto International Film Festival. On 9 September 2016, the film won the Queer Lion at the 73rd Venice Film Festival. It was the first Icelandic film to be shown in a competitive section of the Venice Film Festival. It was also nominated for the 2017 Nordic Council Film Prize and won the 2017 Icelandic Edda Awards.

Cast 
 Baldur Einarsson as Þór/ Thor
 Blær Hinriksson as Kristján/ Christian
 Diljá Valsdóttir as Beta/ Beth
 Katla Njálsdóttir as Hanna/ Hannah
 Jónína Þórdís Karlsdóttir as Rakel
 Rán Ragnarsdóttir as Hafdís
 Søren Malling as Sven
 Nína Dögg Filippusdóttir as Hulda
 Gunnar Jónsson as Ásgeir
 Sveinn Ólafur Gunnarsson as Sigurður

Production 
The film is Guðmundur's first feature-length film and he began working on the script in 2007. It was shot in the fall of 2015 in Borgarfjörður eystri, Seyðisfjörður, Vopnafjörður, and Dyrhólaey.

Reception 
The film was well received in Iceland and won the 2017 Icelandic Edda Awards. The script, the dialogue, and the directing of young actors received praise. The cinematography by Sturla Brandt Gøvlen amplified Icelandic nature, with long shots of coastlines and fjords.

On review aggregator website Rotten Tomatoes, the film holds an approval rating of 84% based on 25 reviews, with an average rating of 6.97/10. On Metacritic, which assigns rating to reviews, the film has a weighted average score of 70 out of 100, based on 5 critics, indicating "generally favorable reviews".

References

External links 

 

2016 films
2016 LGBT-related films
2016 romantic drama films
Icelandic romantic drama films
2010s Icelandic-language films
Icelandic LGBT-related films
Febiofest award winners
LGBT-related romantic drama films